Robert Pringle (born 1897) was an English professional footballer who played as a full back.

Career
Born in Stockton, Pringle joined Bradford City from Middlesbrough in August 1922. He made 31 league appearances for the club, before moving to Crewe Alexandra in July 1924.

Sources

References

1897 births
Date of death missing
English footballers
Middlesbrough F.C. players
Bradford City A.F.C. players
Crewe Alexandra F.C. players
English Football League players
Association football fullbacks